English electronic music duo Goldfrapp have recorded songs for seven studio albums, one compilation album and guest features. After signing a contract with record label Mute Records in August 1999, Goldfrapp began to work on their debut studio album, Felt Mountain, which was released in 2000. Alison Goldfrapp and Will Gregory wrote almost all of its songs, and would continue to do so for their later albums. The album's only collaboration was with Tim Norfolk and Bob Locke of the band Startled Insects on the album's third single "Human". The following year, Goldfrapp collaborated with Adrian Utley on the song "End Titles" for the Accelerator soundtrack.

Goldfrapp released their second studio album Black Cherry in 2003. The album's third single "Strict Machine" was co-written with Nick Batt and received an Ivor Novello Award. Supernature, their third studio album, was released in 2005. The album's lead single, "Ooh La La", received a Grammy Award nomination for Best Dance Recording. Batt also co-wrote the album's third single "Ride a White Horse". The duo also wrote and performed six songs for the My Summer of Love soundtrack.

In 2008, Goldfrapp released their fourth studio album Seventh Tree. The album received positive reviews and produced four singles: "A&E", "Happiness", "Caravan Girl" and "Clowns". Their fifth studio album, Head First, followed in 2010. Its lead single "Rocket" earned the band another Grammy Award nomination for Best Dance Recording. Other singles included "Alive" and "Believer". In 2012, Goldfrapp recorded two songs, "Melancholy Sky" and "Yellow Halo", for their compilation album The Singles.

Songs

References

Golfrapp